Tazehabad Golestaneh (also Romanized as Tāzehābād Golestāneh) is a village in Itivand-e Jonubi Rural District, Kakavand District, Delfan County, Lorestan Province, Iran. At the 2006 census, its population was 53, in 13 families. A census in 2010 showed a growth of an additional family and a total population of 69.

References 

Towns and villages in Delfan County